Edward Berlin may refer to:
Edward A. Berlin (born 1936), American musicologist
Eddie Berlin (born 1978), American football wide receiver